Travancore House is the former residence of the Maharaja of Travancore in New Delhi. It is located on Kasturba Gandhi Marg. The building is also known as Travancore Palace.

History 
It was constructed in 1930. The architectural layout is a simple butterfly bungalow, which was unusual for the larger princely residences in New Delhi. 

The building has been categorised as a heritage building by the New Delhi Municipal Council. The effort of the Kerala state government is to transform this heritage building into a cultural complex. As part of this plan, an art gallery has been set up in the Travancore House. It is run under the auspices of Kerala House, which has a number of offices there.

See also 
 Cochin House

References

Further reading

External links 
 
 http://www.delhievents.com/2009/11/travancore-palace.html
 Image of Travancore House 

Royal residences in Delhi
Kingdom of Travancore